Nordic Aluminium is a Finnish aluminium producer. Its shares were listed on Helsinki Stock Exchange from 1997 until 2012.

References

External links
 

Metal companies of Finland